Sorbinil (INN) is an aldose reductase inhibitor being investigated for treatment of diabetic complications including neuropathy and retinopathy. Aldose reductase is an enzyme present in lens and brain that removes excess glucose by converting it to sorbitol. Sorbitol accumulation can lead to the development of cataracts in the lens and neuropathy in peripheral nerves. Sorbinil has been shown to inhibit aldose reductase in human brain and placenta and calf and rat lens. Sorbinil reduced sorbitol accumulation in rat lens and sciatic nerve of diabetic rats orally administered 0.25 mg/kg sorbinil.

References

Aldose reductase inhibitors
Hydantoins
Fluoroarenes
Pfizer brands
Spiro compounds